Peck Hill is a mountain located in the Catskill Mountains of New York southeast of Delhi.

References

Mountains of Delaware County, New York
Mountains of New York (state)